Jerzy Zaruba (1891–1971) was a Polish graphic artist, stage scenographer and caricaturist; author of satirical drawings, political crèches and illustrations for books and magazines. Pupil of Stanisław Lentz. His work was part of the painting event in the art competition at the 1928 Summer Olympics.

Zaruba was member of the group Formiści, co-founder of the Circle of Graphic Artists in Advertising (Koło Artystów Grafików Reklamowych), active member of the Polish Arts Club (Polski Klub Artystyczny), art director of Cyrulik Warszawski. Awarded the Golden Pin with Laurel (Złota Szpilka z Wawrzynem), prize of weekly magazine Szpilka for achievements in the field of humour and satire, for the year 1966. Also awarded the Knight's and Officer's Cross of Polonia Restituta.

As a medium innovator, Zaremba's image composition was influenced by cubism. He was an author of satirical drawings and caricatures of artists and politicians published in satirical press, including Marchołt, Sowizdrzal, Cyrulik Warszawski, Wiadomości Literackie, Szpilki. He also contributed to magazines Stańczyk, Szarża, Wróble na Dachu, Szczutek.

Biography
Jerzy Zaruba was born on 17 July 1891 in Radom, in Vistula Land (now Poland). He graduated Warsaw School of Art (Szkoła Sztuk Pięknych) and Académie des Beaux-Arts in Paris. As a caricaturist, he made his own debut in 1920 in Marchołt.

He died on 21 January 1971 in Warsaw, Poland.

Works

Books

Illustrations

References

 
 
 

1891 births
1971 deaths
People from Radom
People from Radom Governorate
20th-century Polish people
Polish caricaturists
Polish graphic designers
Polish illustrators
Polish satirists
Polish male writers
Polish scenic designers
Cubist artists
Officers of the Order of Polonia Restituta
Olympic competitors in art competitions